Chebotaryov (masculine) or Chebotaryova (feminine) is a Russian surname.
It is also spelled "Chebotarov", "Chebotarev", "Tschebotaröw", "Чеботарёв" (Russian), "Чоботарьов" (Ukrainian).
Notable people with the surname include:

Konstantin Chebotaryov (1892–1974), Soviet painter
Nikolai Chebotaryov (1894–1947), Russian and Soviet mathematician
Nikolai Chebotarev, man whom author Michael Gray claims might have been Tsarevich Alexei Nikolaevich of Russia. For more information, see Romanov impostors.
Valentina Chebotaryova, Red Cross nurse during World War I
Vladimir Chebotaryov, Soviet and Russian film director
Gregory P. Tschebotarioff, Russian-born American civil engineer and son of Valentina Chebotaryova

Occupational surnames
Russian-language surnames